Sketches of Darjeeling is the debut studio album by singer/songwriter Bipul Chettri.

The album is a collection of songs inspired by Bipul's life around the hills of Kalimpong and Darjeeling, two hill towns inhabited mostly by people of Nepalese ethnicities, that sits on the foothills of the Eastern Himalayas in the Indian state of West Bengal and close to the eastern border of Nepal and Bhutan. It explores the different elements and essence of life and culture of those areas with a blend of Nepali folk and contemporary western musical elements.

Background
The foundation for the album was laid after the song "Wildfire (Dadhelo)" spread across playlists of Nepalese all around the world. The song was uploaded on SoundCloud in February 2013 and literally spread like a wildfire.

Recording session for the album begun in 2013. The album was released in 2014 on CD and online platforms. A vinyl record was released in 2021.

Production
All songs of the album are written, composed, arranged and produced by Bipul Chettri except Ram Sailee, composed by Bipul's late father, Nirendra Mohan Chettri.

Recording, mixing and mastering was done by Anindo Bose at Plug n’ Play Studios, New Delhi.

Awards
The album was nominated for multiple categories in the 19th Hero HITS 91.2 FM Awards 2072 (2016), held in Kathmandu, Nepal in March 2016. Among all the competition for "Best Pop/Rock Album" and "Album of the Year", Sketches of Darjeeling picked up the "Best Pop/Rock Album" award.

Track listing

Personnel 
 Bipul Chettri – Vocals, Guitars
 Anindo Bose – Keyboard, Bass
 Rahul Rai – Bass
 Upendra Raj Baraily – Drums, Percussion
 Reuben Narain – Drums, Percussion
 Toni Quadros – Trumpet
 Lokesh Anand – Shehnai
 Suhail Yusuf Khan – Sarangi
Manohar Rai - Cover Art & Design
Sonam Tashi - Photography & Cover Concept, Executive Producer
Anindo Bose - Recorded, Mixed & Mastered at Plug 'N' Play Studios
Bipul Chettri - Producer

References

External links
Sketches of Darjeeling on OKListen.com
Sketches of Darjeeling by Bipul Chettri on iTunes
Sketches of Darjeeling Playlist on YouTube

2014 debut albums
Bipul Chettri albums